Jil Belén Teichmann (born 15 July 1997) is a Swiss professional tennis player. She has been ranked by the Women's Tennis Association (WTA) as high as world No. 21 in singles and No. 73 in doubles. She has won two singles titles and one doubles title on the WTA Tour along with one doubles title on WTA 125 tournaments, plus six singles and five doubles titles on the ITF Women's Circuit.

A former junior world No. 3, Teichmann won a Grand Slam title in the girls' doubles event at the 2014 US Open. That year, she also won a gold medal for Switzerland in mixed doubles at the Summer Youth Olympics in Nanjing.

Her breakthrough as a senior player came in May 2019 when she won her first WTA title in Prague. In July of that year, she won another WTA tournament title after making her first top-10 win over Kiki Bertens. She continued progressing, in March 2021 reaching the semifinals of the WTA 1000 Dubai Championships. With these performances she entered the top 50. Later that year, she reached the final of the Cincinnati Open, a WTA 1000 event, defeating Naomi Osaka, Belinda Bencic, and Karolína Plíšková, before falling to world No. 1, Ashleigh Barty.

Personal life and background
Jil Teichmann was born on 15 July 1997 to mother Regula and father Jacques. She was born and raised in Barcelona, but her parents are from Zürich. Despite being born in Barcelona, Teichmann does not have a Spanish passport. In her youth, she tried various sports but then decided to play tennis on the professional level. She speaks five different languages: German, Spanish, English, French, and Catalan.

Junior career
Teichmann is former junior world No. 3 player. She made her debut on the ITF Junior Circuit in February 2011 at the Grade-4 Swiss Junior Trophy, where she reached the final in doubles. In September 2011, she won her first junior title at the Grade-5 Luzern Junior Competition in singles. In October 2012, she reached the quarterfinals of the Grade A Osaka Mayor's Cup in singles. She won her first doubles title at the Swiss Junior Trophy in February 2013. At her Grand Slam debut at the 2014 Australian Open, she reached the quarterfinals in doubles. In March 2014, she had success at the Grade A Campeonato Internacional Juvenil de Tenis de Porto Alegre, winning titles in both singles and doubles.

She then continued with success, winning the title in doubles at the Grade A Trofeo Bonfiglio, and reached the semifinals in singles. At the 2014 Wimbledon, she also reached the semifinals in doubles. In July 2014, she reached singles quarterfinals and doubles semifinals of the European Junior Championships. She then won the 2014 US Open girls' doubles title along with İpek Soylu, defeating Vera Lapko and Tereza Mihalíková in the final. At the 2015 French Open, she reached quarterfinals in singles and semifinals in doubles. She reached another doubles Grand Slam quarterfinal in 2015 at Wimbledon. She finished her junior career at the 2015 European Junior Championships, where she reached final in singles. As a junior, she won one singles and eight doubles titles in total.

Professional career

2013–18: First steps

Teichmann made her debut at the ITF Women's Circuit at the $10k event in Kreuzlingen in February 2013. In June of the same year, she reached her first ITF semifinal at the $10k Bredeney Ladies Open. Year later, she reached another ITF semifinal, this time at the $25k event in Lenzerheide. In October 2014, she reached her first ITF final, but lost to Polina Leykina at the $10k event in Sharm El Sheikh. In August 2015, she won her first ITF title at the $15k event in Braunschweig, defeating Ekaterina Alexandrova in the final. In May 2016, she made her WTA Tour debut, playing at the Internationaux de Strasbourg, where she also recorded her first WTA Tour match win, defeating Kurumi Nara in the first round. At the 2016 US Open, she made her debut at a major in qualifying, but failed to reach main draw. In May 2017, she finished runner-up at the $100k Open de Cagnes-sur-Mer, losing to Beatriz Haddad Maia in the final. In September, she reached second round of the Premier 5 Wuhan Open, that was her first appearance on that level. At the 2018 US Open, she made her Grand Slam main-draw debut and also recorded her first win on that level.

2019–20: Breakthrough, two WTA Tour singles titles, top 100
Teichmann won her first WTA Tour singles title when she came through the qualifiers to win the Prague Open in May 2019, beating Karolína Muchová in the final. The win took her into the top 100 of the WTA rankings. In July, she reached quarterfinals of the Swiss Open, where she lost to Tamara Korpatsch. The following week, she won the Palermo Ladies Open, securing her first top-10 win with a victory over Kiki Bertens in the final. In August 2020, she reached another WTA final, but lost to Jennifer Brady at the Lexington Challenger. In September, she reached the quarterfinals of the Internationaux de Strasbourg, where she lost to Elina Svitolina.

2021: First WTA 1000 final, four top-10 wins, top 50
The first two tournaments of the year were unsuccessful for Teichmann. First, she played at the Australian Open warm-up event Gippsland Trophy, where she lost to Coco Gauff in the first round. Then she played at the Australian Open but again lost to Gauff. After these losses, she made progress by getting to the quarterfinal at the Phillip Island Trophy in Melbourne. She defeated three Romanian players in a row, Mihaela Buzărnescu, Monica Niculescu and Patricia Maria Țig, right before she faced a loss against Marie Bouzková.

The following week, Teichmann advanced to her first Premier-level semifinal at Adelaide. On her way, she defeated Kristina Mladenovic, Wang Qiang and Anastasija Sevastova. Eventual champion Iga Świątek prevailed in straight sets in the semifinals.

Her next step was the WTA 1000 event in Dubai. After defeating qualifier Katarina Zavatska in the first round, she upset top-10 player Petra Kvitová and reached her first WTA 1000 third round. She followed this up with a win over Ons Jabeur and then took her revenge against Gauff for the two consecutive losses that year. With the win she entered the semifinals where she faced Barbora Krejčíková, and lost in straight sets. As a result, she reached the top 50 at world No. 41, on 15 March 2021.

During her next tournament, the WTA 1000 Miami Open, she was forced to retire during her first-round match against Paula Badosa. However, she then came to the Madrid Open, starting with an upset over world No. 5, Svitolina, saving six match points. In the following round, she was eliminated by Badosa in three sets.

At the WTA 1000 Cincinnati Open, Teichmann, ranked 76th, reached the final as a wildcard defeating en route world No. 2 and second seed, Naomi Osaka, in the round of 16, tenth seed compatriot Belinda Bencic in the quarterfinals, and fifth seed Karolína Plíšková in the semifinals to make the biggest final in her career.

2022: Third WTA 1000 semifinal, top 25 debut, Grand Slam fourth round
She reached her third career WTA 1000 semifinal at the Madrid Open, following four consecutive straight-set wins over Petra Kvitová, Leylah Fernandez, Elena Rybakina, and Anhelina Kalinina in the quarterfinals. Despite being ousted in the last four by Jessica Pegula, Teichmann entered the top 30 at world No. 29 for the first time following the tournament.
At the Italian Open, she recorded a back-to-back win against Rybakina at the same level as the 2022 Madrid 1000 to reach again the quarterfinals in an over three-hours marathon match. It was her 13th career top 20 win, with her 12th coming one day previously over Karolína Plíšková. As a result, she secured a top 25 debut at world No. 24, on 16 May 2022.

At the French Open, she reached the third round, after beating the Serbian Olga Danilović in straight sets, for the first time in her career in 11 attempts. She went one step further to reach the fourth round, having never past the second round at a major before, defeating Victoria Azarenka in a three-sets match lasting three hours and 18 minutes, the longest match thus far. This was her seventh of 14 top-20 wins in 2022. Seeded 18th at Wimbledon, after having an incredible run at the French Open, Teichmann lost in the first round to Ajla Tomljanović, in straight sets.

2023: Eight top-10 win 
She reached the third round in Indian Wells for the first time at this tournament defeating 9th seed compatriot Belinda Bencic for her first top-10 win of the season.

National representation

Junior
At the 2014 Summer Youth Olympics in China, she won the gold medal in mixed doubles, partnering Jan Zieliński. They defeated Ye Qiuyu of China and Jumpei Yamasaki of Japan in the final.

Performance timelines

Only main-draw results in WTA Tour, Grand Slam tournaments, Fed Cup/Billie Jean King Cup and Olympic Games are included in win–loss records.

Singles
Current after the 2023 Dubai Open.

Doubles
Current after the 2023 Australian Open.

Significant finals

WTA 1000 finals

Singles: 1 (1 runner-up)

WTA career finals

Singles: 4 (2 titles, 2 runner-ups)

Doubles: 3 (1 title, 2 runner-ups)

WTA 125 tournament finals

Doubles: 1 (title)

ITF Circuit finals

Singles: 11 (6 titles, 5 runner–ups)

Doubles: 11 (5 titles, 6 runner–ups)

Junior Grand Slam finals

Girls' doubles: 1 (title)

Olympic medal matches

Mixed doubles: 1 (gold medal)

WTA Tour career earnings
Current through the 2022 French Open

Career Grand Slam statistics

Seedings
Tournaments won by Teichmann are in boldface, and advanced into finals by Teichmann are in italics.

Best Grand Slam results details 
Grand Slam winners are in boldface, and runner–ups are in italics.

Singles

Record against top 10 players
Teichmann's record against players who have been ranked in the top 10. Active players are in boldface:

Top 10 wins

Notes

References

External links
 
 
 

1997 births
Living people
Swiss female tennis players
Swiss expatriate sportspeople in Spain
US Open (tennis) junior champions
Swiss people of Spanish descent
Tennis players at the 2014 Summer Youth Olympics
Tennis players from Barcelona
People from Biel/Bienne
Grand Slam (tennis) champions in girls' doubles
Youth Olympic gold medalists for Switzerland
Sportspeople from the canton of Bern